Koroški Selovec is a dispersed settlement in the hills east of Ravne na Koroškem in the Carinthia region in northern Slovenia.

Name
The name of the settlement was changed from Selovec to Koroški Selovec in 1953.

References

External links
Koroški Selovec on Geopedia

Populated places in the Municipality of Ravne na Koroškem